The 1918 Czechoslovak presidential election took place on 14 November 1918. Tomáš Garrigue Masaryk was elected the first Czechoslovak president. The election was uncontested and Masaryk was elected by Acclamation.

Election
Czechoslovakia was established as a result of fall of Austria-Hungary. Masaryk was leader of Czechoslovak resistance against the Austro-Hungarian Empire and was the only candidate. The parliament decided to elected him by Acclamation for a two-year term.

References

Presidential
1918
Uncontested elections